LCD glasses may refer to:
 LCD shutter glasses, a special kind of 3D glasses
 Head-mounted display, a display to have video displayed in front of the eyes, often using LCD technology